835 Olivia (prov. designation:  or ) is a dark background asteroid from the outer regions of the asteroid belt. It was discovered by German astronomer Max Wolf at the Heidelberg-Königstuhl State Observatory on 23 September 1916. Any reference to the origin of the asteroid's name is unknown.

Orbit and classification 

Olivia is a non-family asteroid of the main belt's background population when applying the hierarchical clustering method to its proper orbital elements. It orbits the Sun in the outer asteroid belt at a distance of 2.9–3.5 AU once every 5 years and 9 months (2,109 days; semi-major axis of 3.22 AU). Its orbit has an eccentricity of 0.09 and an inclination of 4° with respect to the ecliptic. The body's observation arc begins at the Bergedorf Observatory on 30 September 1916, one week after its official discovery observation at Heidelberg.

Naming 

Any reference of this minor planet name to a person or occurrence is unknown.

Unknown meaning 

Among the many thousands of named asteroids, Olivia is one of 120 planets for which  has been published. All of these asteroids have low numbers, the first one being . They were discovered between 1876 and the 1930s, predominantly by astronomers Auguste Charlois, Johann Palisa, Max Wolf and Karl Reinmuth.

Physical characteristics 

In the SDSS-based taxonomy, Olivia is a common, carbonaceous C-type asteroid, with a notably low albedo (see below).

Rotation period 

As of 2020, no rotational lightcurve of Olivia has been obtained from photometric observations. The body's rotation period, pole and shape remain unknown.

Diameter and albedo 

References

External links 
 Lightcurve Database Query (LCDB), at www.minorplanet.info
 Dictionary of Minor Planet Names, Google books
 Discovery Circumstances: Numbered Minor Planets (1)-(5000) – Minor Planet Center
 
 

000835
Discoveries by Max Wolf
Named minor planets
19160923